was a JR East railway station located in Rikuzentakata, Iwate Prefecture, Japan. The station was closed following the 2011 Tōhoku earthquake and tsunami and has now been replaced by a provisional bus rapid transit line.

Lines
Rikuzen-Yahagi Station was served by the Ōfunato Line, and is located 79.5 rail kilometers from the terminus of the line at Ichinoseki Station.

Station layout
Rikuzen-Yahagi Station had two opposed side platforms connected by a level crossing. The station was unattended.

Platforms

History
Rikuzen-Yahagi Station opened on 15 February 1933. The station was absorbed into the JR East network upon the privatization of the Japan National Railways (JNR) on April 1, 1987. The station was one of six stations on the Ōfunato Line closed after the 11 March 2011 Tōhoku earthquake and tsunami. Services have now been replaced by a BRT.

Surrounding area
  National Route 343
Yahagi River

See also
 List of railway stations in Japan

External links

  

Railway stations in Iwate Prefecture
Ōfunato Line
Railway stations in Japan opened in 1933
Railway stations closed in 2011
Rikuzentakata, Iwate
Stations of East Japan Railway Company